There have been 16 head coaches in the history of the Eastern New Mexico Greyhounds football program.

Tiny Reed

Reed held the position for the 1934 season.
His coaching record at Eastern NMU was 7 wins, 0 losses, and 2 ties.  This ranks him
tenth at Eastern NMU in terms of total wins and first at Eastern NMU in terms of winning percentage.

Jerry Dalrymple

Dalrymple held the position for the 1935 season.  His overall coaching record at Eastern NMU was 7 wins, 4 losses, and 0 ties.  This ranks him tenth at Eastern NMU in terms of total wins and second at Eastern NMU in terms of winning percentage.

(in two spells) Al Garten

Garten held the  position for fourteen seasons, from 1936 until 1937 and then returning from 1939 until 1953. His overall coaching record at Eastern NMU was 66 wins, 62 losses, and 4 ties. This ranks him second at Eastern NMU in terms of total wins and seventh at Eastern NMU in terms of winning percentage.[1]

The school did not field a football team from 1942 through 1944 because of World War II.

R. P. Terrell

Terrell held the position for the 1938 season. His overall coaching record at Eastern NMU was 3 wins, 5 losses, and 2 ties. This ranks him 13th at Eastern NMU in terms of total wins and 11th at Eastern NMU in terms of winning percentage.[1]

Carl Richardson

Richardson held the position for ten seasons, from 1954 until 1963. His overall coaching record at Eastern NMU was 57 wins, 37 losses, and 3 ties. This ranks him third at Eastern NMU in terms of total wins and fifth at Eastern NMU in terms of winning percentage.[1]

B. B. Lees

Lees held the position for three seasons, from 1964 until 1966. His overall coaching record at Eastern NMU was 9 wins, 18 losses, and 1 ties. This ranks him eighth at Eastern NMU in terms of total wins and tenth at Eastern NMU in terms of winning percentage.[1]

Howard White

White held the position for three seasons, from 1967 until 1969. His overall coaching record at Eastern NMU was 8 wins, 20 losses, and 1 ties. This ranks him ninth at Eastern NMU in terms of total wins and 13th at Eastern NMU in terms of winning percentage.[1]

Jack Scott

Scott held the position for eight seasons, from 1970 until 1977. His overall coaching record at Eastern NMU was 40 wins, 41 losses, and 2 ties. This ranks him fifth at Eastern NMU in terms of total wins and eighth at Eastern NMU in terms of winning percentage.[1]

Dunny Goode

Dunny Goode held the position for five seasons, from 1978 until 1982.  His coaching record at Eastern NMU was 21 wins, 29 losses, and 1 tie.  This ranks him sixth in terms of total wins and ninth in terms of winning percentage.

Bill Kelly
 
Kelly held the position for two seasons, from 1983 until 1984. His overall coaching record at Eastern NMU was 13 wins, 7 losses, and 1 ties. This ranks him seventh at Eastern NMU in terms of total wins and third at Eastern NMU in terms of winning percentage.[1]

Don Carthel

Carthel held the position for six seasons 1985 - 1991 with 37 wins and 25 losses.
Guided the Greyhounds to their first ever conference title in 1991. Michael Sinclair was the MVP of the team and played for the Seattle Seahawks for 6 seasons. He led the NFL in Sacks in his 5th season beating out the late Reggie White. 
other standout players.
Anthony Pertile-Midland, Texas
Murrary Garrett-Bay City, Texas
Pete Sanders-Roswell, New Mexico
Ron Arrington-Pampa, Texas
Thomas Young-Bay City Texas

Howard Stearns

Stearns held the position for two seasons, from 1992 until 1993. His overall coaching record at Eastern NMU was 6 wins, 13 losses, and 1 ties. This ranks him 12th at Eastern NMU in terms of total wins and 11th at Eastern NMU in terms of winning percentage.[1]

Harold Elliott

Elliott held the position for 11 seasons, 1994–2004, with a 68-49-2 record.  Elliott led the Greyhound to 7 consecutive winning seasons and 2 Lone Star South Co Championships.

Mark Ribaudo

Josh Lynn

References

Eastern New Mexico

New Mexico sports-related lists